Kaw or KAW may refer to:

Mythology
 Kaw (bull), a legendary bull in Meitei mythology
 Johnny Kaw, mythical settler of Kansas, US
 Kaw (character), in The Chronicles of Prydain

People
 Kaw people, a Native American tribe

Places
 Kaw, French Guiana, a town
 Kaw City, Oklahoma, US
 Kaw Lake, Oklahoma, US
 Kansas River, US, known as Kaw

Other uses
 Kaw (film), 2007
 Kawthaung Airport, Burma, by IATA code

See also
 Kaw Valley FC, an American soccer club based in Kansas